Aechmea romeroi is a plant species in the genus Aechmea. This species is native to Ecuador and Colombia.

References

romeroi
Flora of Ecuador
Plants described in 1955
Flora of Colombia